Merrick Glacier is a steep tributary glacier just east of Sennet Glacier in the Britannia Range in Antarctica, descending southwestward to enter Byrd Glacier at the west end of Horney Bluff.

References

Glaciers of Oates Land